

Wolfgang Lange (1 June 1898 – 10 February 1988) was a German general during World War II. He was a recipient of the Knight's Cross of the Iron Cross. Lange surrendered to the American troops on 15 April 1945 in the Ruhr Pocket.

Awards and decorations

 Knight's Cross of the Iron Cross on 14 May 1944 as Generalmajor and commander of Korpsabteilung C

References

Citations

Bibliography

 

1898 births
1988 deaths
Lieutenant generals of the German Army (Wehrmacht)
Recipients of the clasp to the Iron Cross, 1st class
Recipients of the Knight's Cross of the Iron Cross
People from Tübingen
Military personnel from Baden-Württemberg
German Army personnel of World War I
German Army generals of World War II